The women's 100 metres T36 event at the 2020 Summer Paralympics in Tokyo, took place on 1 September 2021.

Records
Prior to the competition, the existing records were as follows:

Results

Heats
Heat 1 took place on 1 September 2021, at 11:15:

Heat 2 took place on 1 September 2021, at 11:22:

Final
The final took place on 1 September 2021, at 19:10:

References

Men's 100 metres T36
2021 in women's athletics